Black hat, blackhats, or black-hat refers to:

Arts, entertainment, and media
 Black hat (computer security), a hacker who violates computer security for little reason beyond maliciousness or for personal gain 
 Black hat, part of black and white hat symbolism in film
 Blackhat (film), a 2015 film
 Black Hat, the main character of the upcoming Cartoon Network Original, Villainous (web series)

Other uses
 Black Hat Briefings, a security conference
 Black Hat, New Mexico, community in the United States
 Chorni Klobuky (or Black hats), a group of Turkic-speaking tribes
 Haredi Judaism, whose adherents are colloquially referred to as "Black Hats"
 Iron Brigade (or The Black Hats), a unit in the Union Army during the American Civil War
Special Skills Instructors in the United States Army Airborne School

See also
 Black Hat Jack, an American novella written by Joe R. Lansdale
 Black cap
 White hat (disambiguation)